Sam Hughes (born 1983), known online as qntm, is a British programmer and science fiction author. Hughes has written for the SCP Foundation, and his book There Is No Antimemetics Division (2021) is derived from that fictional universe. He contributed to SCP-055 alongside user CptBellman. On his personal website, Hughes writes short stories such as "I Don't Know, Timmy, Being God is a Big Responsibility" (2007) and "Lena" (2022), about the first digital snapshot of a human brain, and serial novels such as Ra and Fine Structure.

In 2022, Hughes created Absurdle, a variant of Wordle wherein the word changes with every guess, while still remaining true to previous hints. The Guardian described it as "the machiavellian version of Wordle", and Hughes described it as an "experiment to find the most difficult [...] variant of Wordle", comparing it to one of his previous projects, the Tetris variant Hatetris.

Bibliography 
Hughes' novels are all self-published.

References

External links 
 Official website
 qntm at SCP Foundation
 Sam Hughes at the Internet Speculative Fiction Database

Science fiction writers
Living people
SCP Foundation
1983 births